Victoria Iftodi (born 13 January 1969) is a Moldovan jurist and politician. She served as Minister of Justice from 19 March 2018 to 8 June 2019.

She also served as Minister of Justice from 8 July 2004 to 20 September 2006.

References 

Living people
1969 births
Place of birth missing (living people)
Women government ministers of Moldova
Moldovan Ministers of Justice
21st-century Moldovan politicians
Moldova State University alumni
21st-century Moldovan women politicians
Female justice ministers